Bulbophyllum platybulbon is a species of plant in the family Orchidaceae. It is native to Cameroon and Gabon.  Its natural habitat is subtropical or tropical dry forests. It is threatened by habitat loss.

References

platybulbon
Orchids of Cameroon
Orchids of Gabon
Plants described in 1906
Critically endangered flora of Africa
Taxonomy articles created by Polbot